An archaeology museum is a museum that specializes in the display of archaeological artifacts.

Types
Many archaeology museum are in the open air, such as the Ancient Agora of Athens and the Roman Forum. Others display artifacts inside buildings, such as National Museum of Beirut and Cairo's Museum of Egyptian Antiquities. Still others, display artifacts both outside and inside, such as the Tibes Indigenous Ceremonial Center.  Some archaeology museums, such as the Western Australian Museum, may also exhibit maritime archaeological materials. These appear in its Shipwreck Galleries, a wing of the Maritime Museum. This last museum has also developed a 'museum-without-walls' through a series of underwater wreck trails.  An outside museum was erected at an active archaeological dig site in Nyaung-gan cemetery in Myanmar.

See also
 Open-air museum
 International Council of Museums
 International Museum Day (18 May)
 List of museums
 .museum
 Museum education
 Museum fatigue
 Museum label
 Types of museums

Notes

References

Types of museums